Jamie Lucraft is a British actor.

He is best known as a child actor appearing in an episode of The Vicar of Dibley 'The Window & The Weather' in 1994 as Colin. His best remembered role is as Jake Prentice in the sitcom Next of Kin alongside Penelope Keith and William Gaunt for 3 series from 1995 – 1997.

References

External links 

British male child actors
Living people
Year of birth missing (living people)
Place of birth missing (living people)